Cuore sacro (Sacred heart) is a 2005 Italian film which tells the story of an Italian workaholic businesswoman Irene (Barbora Bobuľová) who experiences the loss of two of her friends by suicide. This loss, combined with her desire to sell off a piece of property that includes the living quarters of her eccentric mother, ends up sending her on a journey of emotional and spiritual transformation.

Awards
The movie won the 2005 David di Donatello awards for Best Actress (Barbora Bobuľová) and Best Production Design (Andrea Crisanti). Other awards were won at the 2005 Flaiano Film Festival, including the Audience Award for Best Actress (Barbora Bobulova), Best Cinematography (Gianfilippo Corticelli), and Best Supporting Actress (Erika Blanc).

Cast
 Barbora Bobuľová: Irene Ravelli
 Camille Dugay Comencini: Benny
 Lisa Gastoni: Eleonora Ravelli
 Massimo Poggio: padre Carras
 Gigi Angelillo: Aurelio
 Erika Blanc: Maria Clara Ravelli
 Andrea Di Stefano: Giancarlo
 Caterina Vertova: Angela Marchetti
 Stefano Santospago: Giorgio Marchetti
 Michela Cescon: Anna Maria
 Paolo Romano: Alberto
 Stefania Spugnini: Liliana
 Elisabetta Pozzi: Psicologa

External links 
 

2000s Italian-language films
2005 drama films
2005 films
Films directed by Ferzan Özpetek
Films set in Rome
Films about suicide
Italian drama films
2000s Italian films